Virgen Benavides Muñoz (born December 13 or 31, 1974) is a track and field sprint athlete who competes internationally for Cuba.

Benavides represented Cuba at the 2008 Summer Olympics in Beijing. She competed at the 100 metres sprint and placed third in her first round heat after Ivet Lalova and Montell Douglas in a time of 11.45 seconds. She qualified for the second round in which she failed to qualify for the semi finals as her time of 11.40 was the fifth time of her race.

Personal best
Outdoor
100 m: 11.14 s (wind: +1.3 m/s) –  Camagüey, 26 February 1999
200 m: 22.93 s (wind: +0.6 m/s) –  Camagüey, 11 March 2000

Indoor
60 m: 7.16 s –  Karlsruhe, 15 February 2004

Achievements

References

External links
 
Sports reference biography
Tilastopaja biography

1974 births
Living people
Cuban female sprinters
Olympic athletes of Cuba
Athletes (track and field) at the 1999 Pan American Games
Athletes (track and field) at the 2003 Pan American Games
Athletes (track and field) at the 2007 Pan American Games
Athletes (track and field) at the 2004 Summer Olympics
Athletes (track and field) at the 2008 Summer Olympics
Pan American Games medalists in athletics (track and field)
Pan American Games bronze medalists for Cuba
Universiade medalists in athletics (track and field)
Central American and Caribbean Games gold medalists for Cuba
Competitors at the 1998 Central American and Caribbean Games
Competitors at the 2006 Central American and Caribbean Games
Universiade bronze medalists for Cuba
Central American and Caribbean Games medalists in athletics
Medalists at the 1999 Summer Universiade
Medalists at the 1999 Pan American Games
Medalists at the 2003 Pan American Games
Medalists at the 2007 Pan American Games
Olympic female sprinters
People from Santiago de Cuba Province